Sir John Maclean, 1st Baronet, (1604 – 7 July 1666) also known as John Makeléer or Hans Makeléer in Sweden, was Lord of Gåsevadholm, and Hageby and Hammarö. He lived in Gothenburg, Sweden. He was made a Baronet by Charles II of England and was made Lord of Gåsevadholm, Hageby, and Hammarö by Christina of Sweden in 1649.

Biography
John was born in 1604 at Duart Castle, Mull, Argyll, Scotland. He was the son of Hector Og Maclean, 15th Clan Chief and Isabella Atcheson of Gosford, daughter of Sir Archibald Acheson, 1st Baronet. His full brother was Donald MacLean, 1st Laird of Brolas Isabella was the daughter of Sir Archibald Acheson, 1st Baronet. John MacLean then became an officer in the Royal Navy.

Emigration and marriage
He emigrated to Gothenburg, Sweden in 1620, where he had an uncle that worked as a merchant. Now known as John Makeléer or Hans Makeléer, he worked as a merchant, and married Anna Gubbertz (c.1595–1653) or Anna Quickelberry in 1629 in Gothenburg. Anna's sister was married to one of John's relatives, Jacob Makeléer (Jacob Macklier). He was named a town councilor in 1640 and remained one through 1650. John Hans Makeléer and Anna had fifteen children, with ten surviving to adulthood. They are:

Children
Charles Makeléer who died young.
Jacob Makeléer (1632–1663) was in the service of Charles XI of Sweden in England. He married Catherine Cochrane, the daughter of Colonel John Cochrane (colonel). Jacob may have taken his own life during an illness.
Johan Makeléer, 2nd Baronet (c1630–1696), of the Gothenburg Court of Justice. He married Anna Margareta Gordon.
Peter Makeléer was colonel and commandant in Stralsund, and he married Abolla Sophia Vanplassen.
Gustavus Makeléer was colonel in the Swedish army and commandant in Gothenburg.
Carl Leonard Makeléer (1633–1663)
Maria Makeléer who married General David Duncan (general). He was in the service of the King of Denmark.
Catharina Makeléer (1637–1709) who married, first, Colonel David Sinclair (colonel), and secondly, General Baron Malcolm Hamilton of Hageby.
Eliza Makeléer, she was married to Major Cailenkerheilm.
Anna Makeléer (1638–1646).
Lunetta Makeléer (1639–1693) who married Joakim Cronman (c.1640–1703). He was a Colonel in the service of the Swedish Empire and the Commandant at Neumünde. This is the Ruuth-Näslund-Winblad line. 
Maria Sophia Makeléer (1640–1721). 
Gustaf Adolf Makeléer (1641–1706) who was a Captain in the Swedish Army who married Sara Carlberg (1647–1701).
Elsa Beata Makeléer (1643–1730) who married Major Marten Christensson.
David Makeléer, 1st Friherre (1645–1708), a General in the army and the first governor of Älvsborg County, Sweden from 1693 to 1708 who married the countess of Arenberg. General David left five sons and two daughters, of whom John Aldolphus MacLean was general in the army and colonel of the Life Guards.

Baronet
In 1635 he loaned 1,150 thalers to Queen Christina of Sweden to supply her army at a time when the Royal treasury was depleted. In May 1649 he was awarded a Baronetcy by Charles II of England.

On 30 December 1655 he married Lilian Hamilton. After her death he married Anna Thompson. He died in 1666.

1604 Birth in Scotland
1629 Emigration to Gothenburg, Sweden at age 25
1629 Marriage to Anna Gubbertz
1633 Birth of Carl Leonard Makeléer
1635 (circa) Birth of David Makeléer
1635 Advanced the sum of 1150 thalers to Queen Christina at a time when the Exchequer was exhausted and new armaments were urgently required
1637 Birth of Catharina Makeléer
1638 Birth of Anna Makeléer
1639 Birth of Lunetta Makeléer
1641 Birth of Gustaf Adolf Makeléer
1643 Birth of Elsa Beata Makeléer
1649 Received the title Lord
1649 Visit of James Graham
1653 Death of first wife, Anna Gubbertz
1655 Married second wife, Lilian Hamilton
1666 Death in Sweden

References

See also

Anders Örbom
Joachim von Rohr

1604 births
1666 deaths
17th-century Swedish people
17th-century Scottish people
People from Argyll and Bute
Scottish military personnel
Scottish naval personnel
Scottish businesspeople
Royal Navy officers
John
Johan
Scottish emigrants to Sweden
Scottish bankers
Scottish Jacobites